The Mauritanian Party of Union and Change (Parti mauritanien de l'union et du changement, HATEM) is a political party in Mauritania. The party won in the 19 November and 3 December 2006 elections 2 out of 95 seats and in the 21 January and 4 February 2007 Senate elections 3 out of 56 seats. In the 11 March and 25 March 2007 presidential elections, its candidate Saleh Ould Hanenna won 7.65%.

Political parties in Mauritania